Arnolfo "Arnie" Alipit Teves Jr. (born August 10, 1971) is a Filipino politician. A member of the Nationalist People's Coalition, he currently serves as a member of the Philippine House of Representatives representing the 3rd District of Negros Oriental since 2016. He served as a Deputy Speaker of the Philippine House of Representatives from December 7, 2020, until June 1, 2022. He is also a radio host of Teves Cares Live: Aksyon, Tulong, Solusyon on DZRH and DZRH News Television.

Political career 
In 2016, Teves was elected member of the Philippine House of Representatives representing the 3rd District of Negros Oriental. He was re-elected in 2019 and in 2022.

Congressional career and controversy 

On September 17, 2020, Teves challenged Camarines Sur 2nd District Representative L-ray Villafuerte to a fistfight and dropped homophobic slurs to refer to Villafuerte after the former questioned the budget allocation of the Department of Public Works and Highways (DPWH) to various congressional districts in the country, particularly the funds allocated to the localities of Villafuerte and House Speaker Alan Peter Cayetano.

Teves also pushed Paolo Duterte to stage a coup d'état against Cayetano. 

Teves is one of the 70 representatives who voted to deny the ABS-CBN franchise on July 10, 2020.

In the 19th Congress, Teves filed a bill seeking to rename Ninoy Aquino International Airport (NAIA) to Ferdinand E. Marcos International Airport (FEMIA) in honor of the late President Ferdinand Marcos. Teves also filed House Bill No. 611, seeking to declare ghosting as an emotional offense which was met with generally negative reception.

Assassination of Roel Degamo

In March 4, 2023, one month after the Supreme Court proclaimed Roel Degamo as governor of Negros Oriental in a contested election versus former governor, and brother of Arnolfo Teves Jr., Pryde Henry Teves, Degamo was assassinated in his home. Teves has denied any involvement in his death, slamming those who try to pin him down and citing that the Teves's have nothing to gain. He has not been seen in the Philippines since the assassination, and in March 15, has requested for a two-month leave, citing a "very grave threat" to his life and his family.

Personal life
Teves is a self-confessed recovering drug addict. From a clan of politicians and businessmen, Arnie Teves Jr. is the brother of politician Pryde Henry Teves. They are nephews of Margarito Teves, Former Secretary of Finance of Philippines under President Gloria Macapagal Arroyo, and grandsons of Former Governor of Negros Oriental Herminio “Meniong” Teves. They are also related to another governor, Lorenzo Teves.

References 

Living people
1971 births
Members of the House of Representatives of the Philippines from Negros Oriental
Nationalist People's Coalition politicians
Filipino radio personalities